Ulrich Meleke (born 24 May 1999) is an Ivorian professional footballer who plays as a central defender for Liga I club FC Voluntari.

Honours
FC Voluntari
Cupa României runner-up: 2021–22

Ivory Coast U20   
Toulon Tournament runner-up: 2017

References

External links
  
  

1999 births
Living people
Footballers from Abidjan
Ivorian footballers
Ivory Coast youth international footballers
Association football defenders 
Liga I players 
FC Botoșani players  
CFR Cluj players
FC Voluntari players
Liga Leumit players
Hapoel Tel Aviv F.C. players
Hapoel Bnei Lod F.C. players
Ykkönen players
Ekenäs IF players
Kokkolan Palloveikot players
Ivorian expatriate footballers
Ivorian expatriate sportspeople in Finland
Ivorian expatriate sportspeople in Israel
Ivorian expatriate sportspeople in Romania
Expatriate footballers in Finland 
Expatriate footballers in Israel
Expatriate footballers in Romania